The following elections occurred in the year 1970.

 1970 Chilean presidential election

Africa
 1970 Cameroonian parliamentary election
 1970 Cameroonian presidential election
 1970 Dahomeyan presidential election
 1970 Democratic Republic of the Congo parliamentary election
 1970 Democratic Republic of the Congo presidential election
 1970 Ivorian general election
 1970 Lesotho general election
 1970 Malagasy parliamentary election
 1970 Moroccan parliamentary election
 1970 Nigerien parliamentary election
 1970 Nigerien presidential election
 1970 Rhodesian general election
 1970 Seychellois parliamentary election
 1970 South African general election
 1970 Tanzanian general election
 1970 Upper Volta parliamentary election

Asia
 1970 Ceylonese parliamentary election
 1970 Pakistani general election
 1970 Philippine Constitutional Convention election
 1970 Soviet Union legislative election

Australia
 1970 Australian Senate election
 1970 South Australian state election

Europe
 1970 Albanian parliamentary election
 1970 Finnish parliamentary election
 1970 Soviet Union legislative election
 1970 Swedish general election

Austria
 1970 Austrian legislative election

France
 1970 French cantonal elections

United Kingdom
 1970 South Ayrshire by-election
 1970 Bridgwater by-election
 1970 Enfield West by-election
 1970 United Kingdom general election
 List of MPs elected in the 1970 United Kingdom general election
 1970 Greater London Council election
 1970 St Marylebone by-election
 1970 University of Kent at Canterbury Chancellor election

Americas
 1970 Guatemalan general election
 1970 Salvadoran legislative election

Canada
 1970 Edmonton municipal by-election
 1970 New Brunswick general election
 1970 Northwest Territories general election
 1970 Nova Scotia general election
 1970 Prince Edward Island general election
 1970 Quebec general election
 1970 Yukon general election

Mexico
 1970 Mexican general election

United States

 1970 United States House of Representatives elections
 ... in Alaska
 ... in California
 ... in Florida
 ... in New York
 ... in North Dakota
 ... in Massachusetts
 ... in South Carolina
 1970 United States Senate elections
 ... in Florida
 ... in Massachusetts
 ... in New York
 ... in North Dakota

United States gubernatorial
 1970 Alabama gubernatorial election
 1970 California gubernatorial election
 1970 Florida gubernatorial election
 1970 Georgia gubernatorial election
 1970 Maine gubernatorial election
 1970 Massachusetts gubernatorial election
 1970 Minnesota gubernatorial election
 1970 Oregon gubernatorial election
 1970 Pennsylvania gubernatorial election
 1970 South Carolina gubernatorial election

Other 
 The Battle of Aspen
 1969–70 New Orleans mayoral election
 1970 New York state election
 Forward Thrust  (Washington (U.S. state))

Oceania

Australia
 1970 Australian Senate election
 1970 South Australian state election

 
1970
Elections